The 1916 Colorado Agricultural Aggies football team represented Colorado Agricultural College (now known as Colorado State University) in the Rocky Mountain Conference (RMC) during the 1916 college football season.  In their sixth season under head coach Harry W. Hughes, the Aggies compiled a 6–0–1 record, won the RMC championship, and outscored all opponents by a total of 172 to 45.

Four Colorado Agricultural players received all-conference honors in 1916: center Charles Shepardson, tackle Horace Doke, end Ralph (Sag) Robinson, and guard Ray West.

Schedule

References

Colorado Agricultural
Colorado State Rams football seasons
Rocky Mountain Athletic Conference football champion seasons
Colorado Agricultural Aggies football